Ardsley and Robin Hood is an electoral ward of Leeds City Council in the south of Leeds, West Yorkshire, covering suburb areas and villages including Robin Hood, Tingley as well as both West and East Ardsley.

Councillors 

 indicates seat up for re-election.
 indicates councillor defection.
* indicates incumbent councillor.

Elections since 2010

May 2022

May 2021

May 2019

May 2018

May 2016

May 2015

May 2014

May 2012

May 2011

May 2010

See also
Listed buildings in Leeds (Ardsley and Robin Hood Ward)

Notes

References

Wards of Leeds